Al-Dalhamiyya was a Palestinian Arab village in the Tiberias Subdistrict. It was depopulated during the 1947–1948 Civil War in Mandatory Palestine on April 15, 1948, under Operation Gideon. It was located 14 km south of Tiberias, on the north bank of the Yarmuk River, on the border between Mandatory Palestine and Transjordan.

History

Ottoman era

In 1838 Al-Dalhamiyya was pointed out to Edward Robinson during his travels in the area, as being located on the eastern bank, about half a mile above the mouth of the Yarmuk.

In 1875 Victor Guérin noted that the  houses of the village were built of adobe, and most were surmounted by reed huts. The same year C. R. Conder  called it a "miserable" adobe  hamlet.  A population list from about 1887 showed  ed Delhamiyeh wa ’Arab el Hanady to have  about  650  inhabitants;  all Muslims.

Menachemya was founded by Zionist in 1902, close to the village, but not on village land.

British Mandate era

At the time of the 1922 census of Palestine  conducted by the British Mandate authorities, Delhamiyeh had a population of 352; 349 Muslims and 3 Jews,  decreasing to 240; 226 Muslims, 1 Jew and 13 Christians, living in 50 houses by the 1931 census.

Ashdot Ya'aqov, southwest to the village site, and  Ashdot Ya'aqov Me'uchad, west of the village site, were settled by Zionist in 1933, but none on village land.

In the 1944/1945 statistics, the village had a population of 410; 390 Muslims and 20 Christians, with a total of 2,852 dunams of land.  Of this, Arabs used 29 dunams for plantations and  irrigable land, 1,709 dunams were used for cereals,  while a total of 442 dunams were un-cultivable.

1948, aftermath

In 1992 the village site was described: "The village has been obliterated. There is a banana grove on the site that belongs to the nearby kibbutz, Ashdod Ya'aqov."

References

Bibliography

External links
 Welcome To al-Dalhamiyya
 al-Dalhamiyya,  Zochrot
Survey of Western Palestine, Map 9:     IAA, Wikimedia commons

Arab villages depopulated during the 1948 Arab–Israeli War
District of Tiberias